Charles Michael Davis (born December 1, 1984) is an American actor, model, producer, and director. He is best known for his roles as Marcel Gerard on The CW television drama The Originals (2013–2018) and Zane Anders on the TV Land original series Younger (2017–2021). He also starred as Special Agent Quentin Carter on NCIS: New Orleans.

Life and career 
Davis was born in Dayton, Ohio. He graduated from Stebbins High School in the Dayton suburb of Riverside and from Miami University in Oxford, Ohio. He is of African American and Filipino descent. His father is from Kentucky and his mother is from Manila.

Davis got his start at an Actors, Models, and Talent for Christ (AMTC) event. Davis has done print modeling and commercials for Nike and FootLocker.

Davis has had guest and recurring appearances in several notable television shows, including That's So Raven, Switched at Birth, and Grey's Anatomy. In 2011, he landed a recurring role on BET's The Game as Kwan Kirkland, a quarterback for the San Diego Sabers.

In February 2013, it was announced that Davis was cast in a lead role on The CW's new show The Originals, a spinoff of The Vampire Diaries, centered on the Original Family as they move to New Orleans, where Davis' character (a vampire named Marcel) currently rules.

In 2018, after appearing in a recurring capacity in the fourth season of the American comedy-drama Younger, Davis was promoted to the series' main cast for its fifth season.

Davis joined the cast of NCIS: New Orleans in March 2020, playing the role of Special Agent Quentin Carter, the new agent for NCIS New Orleans office.

On July 17, 2020, Davis starred alongside Laura Harrier as a couple going through a breakup in the music video for "What's Love Got to Do with It", the remix version by Kygo of the original Tina Turner song.

In March 2022 it was announced that Davis would appear in Legacies as Marcel Gerard.

Personal life 
Davis was in a relationship with choreographer and model Katrina Amato. However, in a September 19, 2014, episode of the CBS talk show The Talk, he disclosed that he is "newly single".

Filmography

Film

Television

Web series

Music videos

References

External links

21st-century American male actors
Living people
African-American male actors
American male actors of Filipino descent
American male television actors
American models of Filipino descent
1981 births
Male actors from Dayton, Ohio
American male film actors
21st-century African-American people
20th-century African-American people